Railway Age is an American trade magazine for the rail transport industry. It was founded in 1856 in Chicago (the United States' major railroad hub) and is published monthly by Simmons-Boardman Publishing Corporation.

History
The magazine's original title was the Western Railroad Gazette, and was renamed the Railroad Gazette in 1870. In June 1908, after purchasing its chief rival, The Railway Age (founded in 1876 in Chicago), it changed its title to Railroad Age Gazette, then in January 1910, to Railway Age Gazette. In 1918 it shortened its name to the current title.

Railway Review (originally the Chicago Railway Review) was merged into Railway Age in 1927.

Publications that have been merged into Railway Age include American Railroad Journal, founded 1832, renamed The Railroad and Engineering Journal in 1887 by its then new owner/editor, Matthias N. Forney. It became American Engineer & Railroad Journal in 1883, then Railway Age Gazette, Mechanical Edition in June 1913 after its acquisition by Simmons-Boardman Publishing. It was renamed  Railway Mechanical Engineer in 1916, and then Railway Locomotives & Cars. It was finally folded into Railway Age in 1975.

In 1992, Railway Age acquired a competing trade publication, Modern Railroads.

Awards
Railway Age presents the Short Line Railroad of the Year, an annual award presented  to North American short line (Class III) railroads, and the Regional Railroad of the Year, an annual award presented to North American regional railroads.

See also
 List of railroad-related periodicals

References

External links

 

1856 establishments in Illinois
Magazines established in 1856
Magazines published in Chicago
Monthly magazines published in the United States
Rail transport magazines published in the United States